The Men's 12.5 kilometre pursuit biathlon competition at the 2002 Winter Olympics was held on 16 February, at Soldier Hollow. Competitors raced over four 2.5 kilometre loops and one 2.75 kilometre loop of the skiing course, shooting four times, twice prone and twice standing. Each miss was penalized by requiring the competitor to race over a 150-metre penalty loop.

The pursuit was a newly introduced race at the 2002 Olympics, with athletes starting in the same order, and with the same time gaps, as their finish in the sprint event a few days earlier. Only the top 60 from the sprint were eligible to enter, though three athletes of the top 60 opted not to start.

Results 

Ole Einar Bjørndalen, having won both of the previous individual events in Soldier Hollow, was going for an unprecedented sweep, and based on his win in the sprint, would start 29 seconds ahead of Sven Fischer, and more than 50 seconds ahead of the third and fourth starters, Wolfgang Perner and Ricco Groß. The World Cup pursuit leader, and defending World Cup overall and pursuit champion Raphael Poirée, was another serious challenger, but he would start over a minute behind Bjørndalen. Pavel Rostovtsev was the defending World Champion, though unlike the World Championships, where he started with the lead, in Salt Lake he started a minute behind the leader, in 6th.

Bjørndalen missed a shot on his first set of attempts, but still held the lead after the first shot, as even a clear shoot from Fischer behind him still gave the Norwegian a 14-second lead. Perner missed once to fall back, with Groß going clear to move into a clear third. That was as close as anyone would get to Bjørndalen all day, as he shot clean at the second and third attempts, and while he missed a shot on the final set, his lead at that point was well over a minute, and the one penalty loop did not cause him any trouble, as he easily claimed the gold medal. Bjørndalen's performance secured a third gold medal in the Salt Lake games, a first for any biathlete.

Fischer and Groß left the second shoot together, after Fischer missed a shot, but a further miss from Fischer on the third set of shots dropped him out of contention. Poirée missed a shot on the second shoot, but went clear at the third, and found himself in third place after misses from men ahead of him, including Rostovtsev, who had been clear before that. Groß arrived at the final shoot with a 25-second lead over Poirée, but missed two shots, while the Frenchman shot clear to virtually reverse the margin, leaving with a 20-second lead of his own, which he held onto to secure silver. Ludwig Gredler seemed to be out of it after a miss in the final shoot, as he left the range 25 seconds behind Gross. The Austrian put in a good chase, though, cutting the lead to just 4 seconds and ending up 4th.

The race was started at 09:00.

References

Men's biathlon at the 2002 Winter Olympics